The Zedriv GT3 is an electric sports car concept made by Zedriv.

Overview

The Zedriv GT3 was shown at the 2019 Auto Shanghai. It has 2 doors and 2 seats, and dimensions of 4000 mm/1650 mm/1280 mm, wheelbase of 2380 mm, with a weight of 1150 kg.

Performance
The Zedriv GT3 concept has a range of 161 miles, 131 horsepower and 129lb-ft (175Nm) of torque, and a 33.9 kWh battery. Zedriv claims a 0-62mph (100km/h) acceleration time of 7.6 seconds and a top speed of 99mph (160km/h).

Design
The design of the Zedriv GT3 EV was criticized to resemble the Porsche 911.

See also
Zedriv GC1
Zedriv GC2
Zedriv GX5

External links
Official website

References

Cars introduced in 2019
Cars of China
Sports cars
Zedriv
Production electric cars